Kill Me Later is a 2001 film directed by Dana Lustig and starring Selma Blair and Max Beesley; it also features Brendan Fehr and Keegan Connor Tracy.

Synopsis 
Blair plays Shawn, a loan officer at a bank who is having an affair with the bank’s married vice-president. After discovering that his wife is pregnant, Shawn has a meltdown and goes to the roof to kill herself.

At the same time, bank robbers hijack an armored car. When the police arrive to stop Shawn from jumping, one of the bank robbers (Thompson) accidentally gets caught. The cops thwart the robbery, but one of the robbers, Charlie Anders (Beesley), takes Shawn hostage at gunpoint. They make a deal: she will help him escape if he promises to kill her afterwards.

Production
A large number of filter effects, shutter effects, and jump cuts are used to make long dialogue scenes (particularly between the two cops and between the two lovers) more visually interesting. The audio itself on both is done as a single long take.

Dana Lustig, the director, makes an on screen appearance as Shawn's stepmother.

It was filmed in Canada.

Soundtrack
Kill Me Laters opening theme was the dream pop song "The Old Fashioned Way" by the New York-based band Luna.

In 2005 the German Industrial metal band Rammstein released Spring. Although the song did not have a promotional music video, an unofficial version which features scenes from the film Kill Me Later, became one of the most watched videos of the band on the Internet.

External links 
 
 

2001 films
American comedy-drama films
Films about suicide
American crime comedy films
2000s crime thriller films
2001 comedy-drama films
Films produced by Ram Bergman
Films directed by Dana Lustig
2000s American films